Aposturisoma myriodon is a species of armored catfish. It is the only species in the genus Aposturisoma.

The generic name derives from Greek apo- meaning "outside", German sturio meaning "sturgeon" and Greek soma meaning "body"; the whole referring to its outwardly similar appearance to a sturgeon.

Aposturisoma  myriodon is native to South America, the Aguaytia River basin in the Upper Amazon River drainage. This species is only known from its type location. This species is rheophilic, preferring to live in shallow, fast waters with a rubble substrate.

These fish may reach a length of  SL. They appear rather similar to the closely related Farlowella, though they have a larger mouth, deeper and wider body, and thicker caudal peduncle.

References

External links
 Images of Aposturisoma  myriodon from Planetcatfish.com

Harttiini
Freshwater fish of Peru
Fish of the Amazon basin
Monotypic freshwater fish genera
Catfish genera
Taxa named by Isaäc J. H. Isbrücker
Taxa named by Heraldo Antonio Britski
Taxa named by Han Nijssen
Taxa named by Hernán Ortega
Fish described in 1983